Marius Köhl (born 31 May 2001) is a German professional footballer who plays as a right winger or centre-forward for Rot-Weiß Koblenz.

Career
Born in Ensdorf, Kohl played youth football for SV Elversberg and JFG Saarlouis before joining 1. FC Saarbrücken in 2018. He made his senior debut as a late substitute for Nicklas Shipnoski in a 2–0 3. Liga win over Viktoria Köln on 13 November 2020. On 1 February 2021, he joined Rot-Weiß Koblenz on loan until the end of the season.

References

Living people
2001 births
German footballers
People from Saarlouis (district)
Footballers from Saarland
Association football forwards
SV Elversberg players
1. FC Saarbrücken players
FC Rot-Weiß Koblenz players
3. Liga players
Regionalliga players